Cinnamodendron angustifolium is a species of flowering plant in the family Canellaceae. It has been found growing in the Grand Anse River valley, in the Western Massif de la Hotte mountain range in southwestern Haiti.  The species had been found and documented only once, in July 1928 by Erik Leonard Ekman.

References 
	

angustifolium